Clear Creek is a stream in Bell County, Kentucky, in the United States. It is a tributary of the Cumberland River.

The waters of Clear Creek was said to hold medicinal qualities.

See also
List of rivers of Kentucky

References

Rivers of Bell County, Kentucky
Rivers of Kentucky